The Seventh-day Adventist Church in Canada (SDACC) is organized as a constituent entity of the North American Division of Seventh-day Adventists (SDA).

The Adventist presence in Canada dates back to the early and mid-1800s and the Millerite movement. William Miller, Joshua Himes, and Josiah Litch all helped build the Millerite cause on Canadian soil.

The Seventh-day Adventist Church became an organized Canadian entity in the late 1870s starting in Quebec. By the first decade of the 1900s, the church had its roots down all across the continent. Today, all of Canada and the French possessions of St. Pierre and Miquelon comprise the official territory of the Seventh-day Adventist Church in Canada.

Its administrative units are the British Columbia, Alberta, Manitoba-Saskatchewan, Ontario, Quebec, and Maritime Conferences and the Seventh-day Adventist Church in Newfoundland and Labrador. The 2018 Seventh-day Adventist Yearbook lists 388 churches and a membership of 71,376.

Adventist enterprises include worship services in local congregations, annual regional "camp meetings", children's summer camps, a world session every five years, the publishing of tracts and journals, broadcast media, evangelistic meetings, and the operation of schools, medical facilities, and humanitarian enterprises.

Early history
 Millerites in Canada

The Seventh-day Adventist Church developed from the Millerite movement of the 1830s and 1840s. William Miller traveled in response to invitations. This led him to the Eastern Townships of Quebec. Miller, Joshua Himes, and Josiah Litch all visited Canada. Miller's sister lived in the Eastern Townships of Quebec. Josiah Litch lived in that district and led in Millerite activities there. Canada became an integral part of their activities. The interest in Miller's teachings was extensive in the Canadas and the Maritimes. Under the leadership of Josiah Litch, the first Millerite camp meeting took place in Canada, at Hatley, Quebec.

 Sabbatarian Adventists

After the disappointment of October 22, 1844, Millerites developed into several divergent groups. The Sabbatarian group led by the Whites, Joseph Bates and others sought out the scattered Millerites and presented their Sabbath understanding to them. In the early 1850s Joseph Bates and Hiram Edson traveled along the northern shore of Lake Ontario trudging through knee-deep snow seeking out the Millerites. Thirty years later, the Adventist presence in Canada was still in its nascent stage. The first Seventh-day Adventist church in Canada was at South Stukely, Quebec. It organized on September 30, 1877, with 16 members.

The Canada Conference, made up of members from both Ontario and Quebec provinces operated in the early 1880s. By the 1890s, North American Adventists were organized into Districts. District 1 included this Canada Conference as well as the mission fields of the Maritime provinces and Newfoundland.

The Canadian Union Conference, 1901

In 1901 the Seventh-day Adventist Church introduced new mid-level administrative units called "Union Conferences" that took over much of the oversight of the local conferences from the General Conference Committee. On the East coast of the United States, the Eastern Union Conference was created. The first session of this union conference took place between November 27 and December 5, 1901, at South Lancaster, Massachusetts.

During this end-of-year session, a number of meetings were held with members of the General Conference Committee along with representatives from Canada, to organize a Canadian Union Conference. It was voted to proceed with the organization of a Canadian Union Conference. A constitution was established. Even though the new entity was called "The Canadian Union Conference", the territory included was only that of Eastern Canada, i.e. Ontario, Quebec, the Maritimes and Newfoundland. Work was to go into effect on January 1, 1902, if two thirds of the Canadian churches agreed.

Early Adventist work in the western part of Canada first came under Union organizations located in the western United States.

Early in 1902, at the organizational meeting for the Pacific Union Conference, it was recommended that the believers in British Columbia be organized into their own separate conference within the Pacific Union.

Two Union Conferences

(Eastern) Canadian Union Conference

The work of the church in Ontario and the eastern provinces retained the name of the Canadian Union Conference when the Western provinces were organized under a separate name.

On New Year's Day, 1915, W. C. White, the son of Ellen G. White, visited at the Eastern Canada headquarters in Oshawa, Ontario. He stayed for several days. He spoke four times, three of which were at Buena Vista Academy (now Kingsway College). During his visit, he gave counsel to the leaders regarding how to extend Adventism in Eastern Canada. He urged them to start church work in new places immediately because "the last days are closing in upon us." He said that ministers should be sent into new areas and that the lay people should take care of the existing churches. He also cited recent counsels from his mother calling on families to enter new areas as self-supporting missionaries.

Western Canadian Union Conference

In 1907 A. G. Daniells, President of the General Conference of Seventh-day Adventists, visited the western Canadian provinces and announced the need to organize these provinces into a "western Canadian Union Conference". "This will give them courage, good cheer, and strength," he wrote. He further noted that, "for a time it will need assistance from the States, but now is the time to give it. Let us remember western Canada in our prayers and gifts."

Canadian Union Conference

The Great Depression affected the church as well as society at large. Several steps were taken to manage the church's finances during this time. The 1931 General Conference's annual council recommended that the two Canadian union conferences be merged into one for all of Canada and Newfoundland. Delegates representing these two organizations met on May 24, 1932, in Winnipeg and decided to merge the two unions. The president of the General Conference, C. H. Watson, and the president of the North American division, J. L. McEIhaney, were present. At this same session it was recommended that the Manitoba and Saskatchewan conferences be merged into one and that the Ontario and St. Lawrence conferences also be merged. Winnipeg became the location for this newly formed Canada-wide conference.

Sunday closing legislation

Early in January 1906, the Lord's Day Alliance (LDA) met with Canadian Prime Minister Laurier and his minister of Justice. They asked that a Sunday-observance bill be enacted during the next session of parliament. As the cabinet of the government discussed the issue, the LDA solicited petition signatures favoring the proposed bill.

W. H. Thurston wrote to Laurier asking for a meeting. In his letter he explains that the proposed Sunday legislation attempts to legislate in God's domain rather than as civil matters. He quotes Matthew 22:21, "Render therefore unto Caesar the things which are Caesar's; and unto God the things that are God's." On this basis the Seventh-day Adventist Church opposed the bill.

The interview with Laurier and his minister of Justice took place January 18, 1906. Thurston, along with H. E. Rickard, A. O. Burrill, and Eugene Leland appeared before Laurier and his minister of Justice in Ottawa. They explained their principles on the issue and gave a brief history of Adventism and its worldwide work. Each of the group presented statements addressing the proposed bill.

According to Thurston, "this meeting was reported to all the papers of the associated press, and the whole matter is before the public...." He continued, "We believe this effort will spread the knowledge of the truth and help to enlighten the people of Canada as nothing else would. Our own people are taking a more active part in the work than in the past, and we hope for a great awakening in this field from now on, and that the message may go with rapidity to all the people of Canada.

The role of door-to-door book sellers

The distribution of Seventh-day Adventist publications helped build the denomination in Canada. Most often, the colporteur, or book-sellers, led the way.

Regional camp meetings

The Canadian conferences of the church organized regional camp meetings as the United States conferences had been doing since the late 1860s. These camp meetings provided unity and fresh ideas for the church at large.

Camp meetings are still run annually in every local Conference for their general membership and interested visitors. Ethnic group or language camp meetings are also offered.

Relation to other Christian churches

The Canadian Foodgrains Bank

The Seventh-day Adventist Church has been a member church of the Canadian Foodgrains Bank since 1990. In this capacity, they associate with about thirty denominations.

The United Church of Canada
In the early twentieth century the United Church of Canada was founded. The Methodist, Presbyterian, and Congregational Churches of Canada united with a common creed and system of government. The process began in 1904. and reached completion in 1925. Adventists noted the new union's ambivalence regarding infant baptism. They agreed with the Baptist church's stand not to join the union because of the issue of baptism. To Adventists, the concept of church union was important but it was only to be entered into on the basis of agreed concepts of biblical truth.

Relation to labour unions

Carlyle B. Haynes led in the denominations war commission and after the war was given the task of managing problems that arose regarding membership in labour unions.

Healthcare

Seventh-day Adventist interest in healthcare began in the 1860s. It gained momentum under the leadership of John Harvey Kellogg in Battle Creek, Michigan. Kellogg's sanitarium inspired outreach centres in various countries. In Canada, centres were begun in Halifax, Nova Scotia; Knowlton, Quebec; Peterborough, Ontario. Later, an Adventist healthcare facility was built in Toronto; Branson Hospital. Branson lasted for several decades until it closed in the late 1980s. The current Adventist healthcare facilities are seniors' homes located near Saint John, New Brunswick; Toronto, Ontario; Winnipeg, Manitoba; Alberta and near Victoria, British Columbia.

Health promotion, NEWSTART

Through the Loma Linda University Public Health department, studies have been conducted on Seventh-day Adventists comparing them to the general population. The results show that the principles of healthful living, if followed, can lengthen a person's life by 11 years. In 1978 a guest at the Weimar Institute in Northern California made an acronym of the principles of Nutrition, Exercise, Water, Temperance (Self-discipline), Air, Rest, and Trust in God. A group of institutions across the United States advocated these health principles.

Freedom of religion

From the late 1800s Seventh-day Adventists have advocated the separation of church and state. Their interest in freedom of religion arose out of federal legislation in the United States which endorsed Sunday rest. In Canada, laws prohibiting labour on Sunday resulted in several cases where Adventists were arrested for working on Sunday.

After the second world war, Canadian interest in human rights grew into a prominent political movement. John G. Diefenbaker advocated a Canadian Bill of Rights. He had provided legal representation for Adventists organizations on the prairies. Adventists considered him a friend. Lawyer Darren L. Michaels led the Canadian SDA Church to add their voice to those advocating the passage of a Canadian Bill of Rights. Michaels reported the issues involved to Adventist via their church paper, the Canadian Union Messenger.

Membership statistics

The Presidents

The Canadian Union

(For a brief time, the Eastern Canadian church continued to be called the Canadian Union while in West, the Western Canadian Union had been established.)

W. H. Thurston, 1901–1909

W. H. Thurston, born November 14, 1855, at Kingston, Wisconsin. He entered his first ministerial work there around 1890. He served as a Wisconsin Tract Society district director and then helped two more experienced preachers with tent evangelism.

In 1894, he and his wife sailed to Brazil along with F. W. Westphal and his wife, who were going to Argentina. The Thurstons were one of the firsts Adventists to work in Brazil. At the 1901 General Conference W. H. Thurston related stories of the work in Brazil. After the 1901 General Conference, he was asked to serve as head of the newly formed Canadian Union Conference covering, Ontario,  Quebec and the Maritime provinces.

Administrative highlights include:
the dedication of Knowlton Sanitarium (1903) in the Eastern Townships of Quebec. Thurston's home became Knowlton.
Oversight and promotion of the Farmington/Williamsdale school in the Nova Scotia.
Encouraging church members to sell "Christ's Object Lessons" and other published material.
Moving the Canadian Union Conference headquarters and the Canadian Publishing Association from Montreal to Toronto. This included an offer to the local conferences to take over their book business except for the decision where to locate agents.
Arranging for the new school, Lornedale Academy, to take over the publishing of the Messenger.
Preparing to address Parliament's pending Lord's Day Act.

After seven years as President of the Canadian Union Conference, Thurston went to Wisconsin to serve as the president of that conference.

He died August 25, 1924, at College Place, Washington. His son, Claude, taught chemistry at Walla Walla College.

William Guthrie, 1909–1912

William Guthrie, born April 9, 1867, joined the Adventist church in 1886. After training at Battle Creek College, he worked in the Iowa Conference starting in 1894. In 1902 he worked in Canada; first in the Maritimes then as president of the Quebec Conference and then, after Thurston, he served as the president of the Canadian Union Conference from 1909 to 1912.

Guthrie oversaw the moving of Ontario's boarding academy from Lorne Park to East of Oshawa.

After his Canadian service, Guthrie served as president of the East Michigan Conference (1912-1916) and then as the head of the West Michigan Conference (1916-1918) after which he served as President of the Lake Union Conference for ten years (1918-1928). After moving to California and taking a break for health reasons, he served as a minister in Southern California for 13 years.

William Guthrie died January 22, 1952, at the Paradise Valley Sanitarium where his son worked as manager.

M. N. Campbell, 1912–1917

In 1921, M. N. Campbell became president of the British Union Conference,

Eastern Canadian Union

M. N. Campbell, 1914-1917

A. V. Olson, 1917–1920
 - In 1907, Olson was a licentiate in St. Paul, Minnesota.
 - Montreal, Canada (1912-1914). In 1913, tent efforts were conducted in Montreal. Olson ran the English campaign and J. Vuilleumier ran the French one.

 - In 1914 he was elected president of the Quebec Conference. - In 1915, Olson was the president of the Quebec Conference of Seventh-day Adventists.
 - in 1929, reported 1300 baptisms in Romania.
 - in 1916 president of the Ontario Conference. - From 1917 to 1920 he was president of the Eastern Canadian Union;
- in 1941, Elder A. V. Olson, president of the Southern European Division, recently wrote as follows :

"Last autumn I spent a couple of months in the Balkans. Things are not rosy in these countries, but I was happy to find our people of good courage in the Lord. The work is growing in Jugoslavia. ... The dismemberment of Rumania deprived that Union of thousands of its members, and it worked havoc with our organization.
 - 1966, authored, Through Crisis to Victory; a history of the church from 1888 to 1901 where Olson asserts that the 1888 message was accepted by the church.

F. W. Stray, 1920–1923

Frederick William Stray was born on May 10, 1874, in New York City. On his twenty-first birthday he married Lottie Walker. Eight years later, Mr. and Mrs. Stray joined the Seventh-day Adventist Church as a result of H. C. Hartwell's work. A few months later, Stray sold his business and began church work as a colporteur. On August 22, 1905, their daughter Caroline was born. She later married Frank Crump. Pastor Fred Crump, one of the sons of Frank and Caroline, also worked for the church in Canada. Before coming to Canada, Stray served as presidents of the Northern New England Conference, the Southern New England Conference and the Kansas Conference.

After serving as president of the Eastern Canadian Union, Stray became president of the Maritime conference. In 1932, the year the Eastern and Western Unions were merged, Stray suffered from a heart attack. He retired from active church work in Nova Scotia.

Stray, apart from pastoral and administrative work, wrote essays explaining various aspects of faith. Some of them: May 30, 1946, Thoughts on Hebrews; 1945, Alpha and Omega. An anti-evolution piece where the Sabbath, in time, is the Alpha and the second coming of Jesus is the Omega;

1946, June 14, Stray died in Saint John, New Brunswick.

Charles F. McVagh, 1923–1928

Charles Fred McVagh was born in Leeds County, Ontario, Canada, February 9, 1869. He died February 13, 1945, in Pinecastle, Florida. He was seventy-six.

In 1888 he married Ella M. Cook at Eldred, Pennsylvania. In 1891 they joined the Seventh-day Adventist Church. He was ordained in 1900. He worked for the church for 45 years.

His work included oversight of the work in the southern United States, Northern Regional Conference, both the Eastern and Western Canadian Unions. He also served as the first editor of the Canadian "Signs of the Times" Magazine. He served as president of six local Conferences in the United States, among which were East Pennsylvania. Michigan, West Pennsylvania, and Iowa.

In 1920, McVagh left the presidency of the Northern Union to come to Canada as the editor of the Canadian Watchman Magazine. In 1923, he became president of the Eastern Canadian Union Conference and continued on with his work as editor. This saved the organization the expense of one position in a time when finances were strained.

In 1925, Mr. and Mrs. McVagh's daughter Ilah underwent an operation at Washington Sanitarium. She suffered from a disease in her mastoid. She died of a heart attack while on the operating table. Ilah was in her last year of training to be a nurse.

W. C. Moffett, 1928–1932

Walter C. Moffett was born on February 17, 1879, in Townsend, Delaware. He began denominational
service in 1897, at eighteen years of age, as a colporteur in what was then the Atlantic Conference, which comprised Delaware, Maryland, and New Jersey. He pastored in Ohio (1905-1907), Pennsylvania, and New York state.

He served as Educational Superintendent for Ohio conference (1911), New Jersey Conference (1914).

For 25 years he served as president in a variety of conferences: Virginia (1915-1918), New Jersey (1919-, Maine (1922), Massachusetts which merged into the Southern New England Conference (1923-1928), West Virginia (1933-1934), Chesapeake (1921, 1935-1940, pastored 1941-1946), West Pennsylvania (1947-1950), and the Eastern Canadian Union Conference (1928-1932). While serving in Canada, he was also the editor of the Canadian Union Watchman.

He helped at the Review and Herald Publishing Association in the circulation department. He was the dean of theology at Washington Missionary College which is now Washington Adventist University.

W. C. Moffett died March 24, 1976, in Hagerstown, Maryland. He was 97.

Western Canadian Union

E. L. Stewart, 1907-1909
H. S. Shaw, 1910-1916
C. F. McVagh, 1916-1919
A. C. Gilbert, 1920-1924
S. A. Ruskjer, 1925-1932

(Eastern and Western Union Conferences were merged)

Seventh-day Adventist Church of Canada

M. N. Campbell, 1932–1936
W. B. Ochs, 1936–1943
H. L. Rudy, 1943–1950
W. A. Nelson, 1950–1962
J. William Bothe, 1962–1973
L. L. Reile, 1973–1981
James W. Wilson, 1981–1989
Douglas D. Devnich, 1989–1993
Orville Parchment, 1994–2001
Daniel R. Jackson, 2002–2010 Jackson moved on to the Presidency of the North American Division, a position he held until his retirement in 2020.

Mark A. Johnson, 2010-2022

Graduate from Union College. Johnson's first assignment was in St. Louis, Missouri. He served in Ontario and Alberta. From Alberta, he was elected to serve as President of the Seventh-day Adventist Church in Canada, an office that he held until 2022.

Related National organizations

Canadian Adventist Messenger
Adventist Development and Relief Agency (ADRA)
Canadian University College
Kingsway College
VOAR - Voice of Adventist Radio
Christian Record Services for the Blind
It Is Written Canada
Voice of Prophecy

Local conferences

The Seventh-day Adventist Church in Canada comprises seven smaller subdivisions of "local conferences".

Newfoundland and Labrador
Comprising churches in the province, also built radio station VOAC in 1933 and changed its name to VOAR in 1938. The station broadcasts in a Christian format across Newfoundland, and other parts of Canada via repeaters.

Maritimes

At the 1895 annual meeting of the Seventh-day Adventist General Conference it was voted that H. J. Farman, of New England, G. E. Langdon, of Nebraska, go to the Maritime Provinces to work. After his arrival, G. E. Langdon reported on evangelistic activity with D. A. Corkham, R. C. Porter, and R. S. Webber.

The Maritime Conference organized in 1902 and covers local congregations and schools in PEI, Nova Scotia and New Brunswick.

Quebec

As mentioned above, Millerite Adventists lived in the Eastern Townships north of Vermont. Then, as the Sabbatarian Adventists visited these people, some joined in the observing of the Seventh-day Sabbath. The first Canadian Seventh-day Adventist church and school started in this area.

The 1855 conversion of two French-speaking brothers led the way to pioneering work among the people of Quebec.  Daniel Bourdeau and his older brother and Baptist preacher, Augustin, first heard the Seventh-day Adventist message from their brother-in-law, W. L. Saxby. They lived in Northern Vermont just south of the Quebec border. As part of their preparation for public meetings, they prepared two French tracts, one on the biblical Sabbath and the other on the prophecies of Daniel. By the winter of 1858-1859 the Bourdeau brothers preached in the border towns of northern Vermont and in villages in Southern Quebec.

During the 1860s, the Bourdeau brothers wanted to reach the French speaking people with their message, but most of their work focused on the English people living in towns along the border between Vermont and Quebec.

In 1869, the Vermont Conference had oversight for the work in Quebec. They voted to "pledge our prayers and hearty cooperation in the work of Foreign Missions [i.e., among the French], and that we will aid by our means, as may be necessary, to carry forward this important branch of the great work in which we are engaged."

The leaders of the newly organized denomination (1863) living in Battle Creek, Michigan, did not consider work among the French in Quebec a high priority. And, the Vermont Conference had limited`financial resources. They couldn't afford to support both brothers in ministry. Thus, Daniel Bourdeau worked in California from 1868 to 1870. Then he went to work among French immigrants in Illinois and Wisconsin until about 1873.

In 1875, Rodney Owen and his father-in-law, Daniel Bourdeau, conducted public meetings in West Bolton. Twelve people became Seventh-day Adventists. The next year, 1876, they repeated their lectures in South Stukely. Seven more joined the Church. Later that year, another series was conducted in Waterloo. And, in 1877, they did another series of meetings in Fulford.  On September 30, 1877, the South Stukely church was organized. It is the oldest congregation in Canada today. It is about an hour from Montreal, in the Eastern Townships of Quebec.

Seventh-day Adventist organized conference work in Canada began in 1880 at an organizational meeting in Magog, Quebec. James White, President of the General Conference, presided over the proceeding. His wife and church visionary, Ellen White, also attended along with former General Conference President and President-soon-to-be-again, George Butler. Augustin and Daniel Bourdeau attended, as well. This newly established "Seventh-day Adventist Conference of the Province of Quebec," included the churches of South Stukely, Barford, and Westbury and two small groups, known as companies, in Sutton and Brome. The officers of the conference were: A. C. Bourdeau, President; D. T. Bourdeau, Secretary; and Andrew Blake, Treasurer.

At the 1881 General Conference it was voted that the province of Ontario, which had been under the supervision of the Michigan Conference should be united with the Quebec Conference under the name of the Conference of Canada. The next year the Canada Conference meeting at Magog, Quebec affirmed the General Conference recommendation. "Resolved, That we indorse (sic) the recommendation of the late General Conference, concerning the annexation of the Province of Ontario to this Conference, and hereby invite Bro. D. T. Bourdeau to labor in the Canada Conference, in harmony with said recommendation."

Ontario

One of the earliest Sabbatarian Adventists to travel Canada West was George W. Holt. In the 1840s and 50s George Holt held a prominent place as a traveling preacher. He was "widely known and dearly loved." In 1850, he visited Canada West making stops at Delaware and Ameliasburgh.

In 1851, Joseph Bates and Hiram Edson, hiked the length of Canada West from the St. Lawrence River to Toronto. They sought out fellow Millerites in order to teach them about the Sabbath. In a letter written from Toronto on New Year's Day, 1852, Bates describes their journey through knee deep snow. They made stops at Mariposa, Skewgog Lakes and Reach. Over twenty people decided to observe the Seventh-day Sabbath.

In 1890, the Ontario Conference organized. In 1904, the fourth annual Indian camp-meeting was held on the Six Nation Reserve, near Brantford, Ont. It began on the evening of Oct. 7 and continued until the evening of the 16th.

Manitoba-Saskatchewan

The Manitoba Conference organized in 1903. The Saskatchewan Conference organized in 1912.
The two conferences merged later.

Alberta

Adventists first came to Alberta in 1895. They were colporteurs Thomas Astleford and George W. Sowler. Sowler was the field agent for Manitoba and the Northwest, which included Alberta. Astleford and Sowler both sold "Bible Readings". Astleford left Winnipeg and went to Edmonton. Sowler stopped off at Calgary and started work there. Sowler sold about two hundred copies of Bible Readings in Calgary. He also sold books to the ranchers from Calgary to Fort Macleod from the Bow River to the foothills. He worked in Edmonton and Fort Saskatchewan and the mountain towns as far as Revelstoke. Eastward, he worked along the main line of the Canadian Pacific Railway to Port Arthur.

Thomas Astleford began in the Edmonton. He then sold books in the towns along the railroad to the south. His work led to the first converts in the province; Gustave Litke of Leduc and Dr. Menzel and his family, of Stony Plain. Litke shared his new faith with his German friends. In response to their request, H. J. Dirksen was sent from Manitoba. Dirksen led in the organizing of a church at Leduc on May 14, 1898, the first SDA church in the Northwest Territories.

Up until 1903, the work of the Adventist church in Alberta was administered as part of the Manitoba Mission. Beginning in 1901, the Adventist Church reorganized itself to include union conferences. The Northern Union Conference, established in 1902, managed the work of the Adventist church in Minnesota, South Dakota, North Dakota, Manitoba, Saskatchewan and Alberta. In 1906, the Alberta Mission was organized into the Alberta Conference. The newly organized Alberta Conference consisted of about 180 members. A year later, the Western Canadian Union Conference was formed. It comprised the conferences of British Columbia, Alberta, and Manitoba and the Saskatchewan Mission. (See the map)

British Columbia

The British Columbia conference organized in 1902 and also covers the Yukon (Whitehorse church) and part of the Northwest Territories.

Cariboo Adventist Academy, Williams Lake
Okanagan Adventist Academy, Kelowna
Fraser Valley Adventist Academy, Aldergrove
Deer Lake School, Burnaby 
Peace Christian School. Chetwynd
Church in the Valley, Langley

See also

Australian Union Conference of Seventh-day Adventists
Seventh-day Adventist Church in Brazil 
Seventh-day Adventist Church in the People's Republic of China
Seventh-day Adventist Church in Colombia 
Seventh-day Adventist Church in Cuba
Seventh-day Adventist Church in India 
Italian Union of Seventh-day Adventist Christian Churches
Seventh-day Adventist Church in Ghana 
New Zealand Pacific Union Conference of Seventh-day Adventists
Seventh-day Adventist Church in Nigeria 
Adventism in Norway
Romanian Union Conference of Seventh-day Adventists
Seventh-day Adventist Church in Sweden 
Seventh-day Adventist Church in Thailand 
Seventh-day Adventist Church of Tonga
Seventh-day Adventists in Turks and Caicos Islands

Endnotes

See also
 Seventh-day Adventist Church
 North American Division of Seventh-day Adventists
 It Is Written
 Pacific Press Publishing Association

References

Books

Little, J. I. (2004). Millennial Invasion: Millerism in the Eastern Townships of Lower Canada. In R. Connors & A. C. Gow (Eds.), Anglo-American millennialism, from Milton to the Millerites (pp. 177–204). Leiden, The Netherlands: Brill. ; 

Journals

Further reading

The Unguarded Moment: A Surgeon's Discovery of the Barriers to Prescription of Inexpensive, Effective Healthcare in the Form of Therapeutic Exercise, Vert Mooney, Vantage Press, Inc, 2007 - Biography & Autobiography - 273 pages

External links

Regional Conferences

National Organizations

Christian denominations in Canada
History of the Seventh-day Adventist Church
Protestant denominations established in the 19th century
Protestantism in Canada
Religious organizations established in 1863
1863 establishments in Canada
Canada
Seventh-day Adventist Church in North America